This is a series of lists of those who have received a producer credit (executive, associate, etc.) on the long-running British science fiction television programme Doctor Who. The definition of producer has changed over the years, as has the nature of television production. Therefore, the list is just of those receiving a producer credit on-screen and not those who have effectively fulfilled producers' roles for the show, such as Terrance Dicks' brief tenure as producer before the arrival of Barry Letts, and a brief spell by David Maloney in 1978 when Graham Williams was incapacitated. It also excludes those who have produced Doctor Who outside the regular series only, such as animated or charity episodes, and in other media, such as the audio dramas from Big Finish Productions.

Producer credits

Executive producer credits

Associate producer credits

Co-producer credits

Line producer credits

Script producer credits

Co-executive producer credits

Showrunner/headwriter credits

See also
List of Doctor Who script editors

References

Producers
Doctor Who